The Pakistan Media Awards, commonly known as The PMA, are a set of awards given annually for radio, TV, film and theatre achievements. The award is a statuette representing a knight with a star on the chest. Its official named is a Pakistan Media Award of Merit.

The awards were first given in 2010. PMA focuses on media achievements including all the occupations comes under media. In television category awards are awarded in talk shows, news channels, reality programs, dramas, sitcoms, daily soaps, and the fashion industry, while awards also acknowledged the efforts of artist in films, radio and specially PMA endeavor to revive theatre industry through this platform.

The 3rd Pakistan Media Awards were held on 30 November 2012 at Expo Centre in Karachi, Sindh. Previously the 4th Pakistan Media Awards were scheduled on 28 December 2013 but due to overwhelming amounts of online votings and on persistent requests of voters, the ceremony was rescheduled for 11 January 2014 at Expo Center, Karachi.

History

The first formal ceremony was held on 7th April 2010 at Karachi Carlton Hotel. Awards were presented in four categories: TV, Film, Radio and Theatre. Organizer and C.E.O of PMA Arshad Siddiqui said that the purpose behind the event was to re-live the Pakistani film industry. He said though he and other private sector were trying to play their level best the cold behavior of government was quite illogical.

The 1st Pakistan Media Awards was held in 2010.2nd Pakistan Media Awards was held on 7 May 2011 at Carlton Hotel, Karachi. Awards hosts were Faisal Qureshi and Aijaz Aslam., The 3rd Pakistan Media Awards was held on 30 November 2012 in Karachi.

PMA Statuette

Structure of PMA Statuette
 Official name: Pakistan Media Award of Merit,
 Height: 12½ inches [CONVERT]
 Weight: 8 pounds [CONVERT]
 Color: Dull Shiny Golden,
 Represents: Pakistan Media Achievements
 Design: A knight having star on his chest, standing on a reel of film.
 Manufacturing time: 9 weeks for 85 Statuettes
 Number of Awards Presented: 90 (as of 1st ceremony)

Design
Pakistan Media Award representing a knight having Star on chest standing on a film reel, it is designed and manufacture by, Triple-E PVT. Limited. PMA statuette has a resemblance with American film award named as Oscar or Academy Award, which also represents a knight holding a sword standing on film reel. The PMA statuette having stars represents the excellent achievements of winners and artist awarded that year.

Nomination

Voters
Since 2010, every year voting generates into two types:
 Viewers Choice Awards
 Jury Choice Awards

in viewer's choices award some popular categories set to open for public voting and awarded that categories upon highest votes by public but the others is opposite and completely voted and viewed by Jury panel. as of 1st Pakistan Media Awards, multiple categories from Film, TV, Radio and theatre were set to open for public voting, for 2nd Pakistan Media Awards collective voting for all categories was 100,000 in history of Pakistan and rest of awards were completely judges and jury based.

The 3rd and upcoming 4th Pakistan Media Awards, rescheduled due to high demand of voting time for the categories open for public, more than of deadline date of votings, Triple-E receives thousands request for extending the date of voting.

Rules

According to Rules of PMA, in film category, a film must open in the previous calendar year from 1 January to 31 December, in Pakistan to qualify, e.g.; if a movie released in 2010 and did not play its PMA-qualifying run in Pakistan will not be qualify for 2010 awards until its completes its screening to qualify for next ceremony. Film must be feature-length, defined as a minimum of 40 minutes, except for short subject awards, and it must exist either on a 35 mm film or 70 mm film print or in 24 frame/s or 48 frame/s progressive scan digital cinema format with native resolution not less than 1280x720.

For Television category, a Drama, soap, telefilm, teleserial, play or sitcom must be from previous year of the ceremony and must have its qualify run, for TV category it is not must that a Drama should have completed its running a drama, soap etc. can be nominated every year till it completes it finale season or final episode.

Radio and Theatre category are awarded according to the year-to-year achievements of the artist and personalities.

Ceremony

Telecast

Pakistan Media Awards telecast recorded, mostly the ceremony held in late months of year, but as of current ceremony for the first time, ceremony was scheduled in last month of the year to honour the dramas and media achievements of 2012, but due to extension of public poll nominations date it is scheduled in early Jan 2014. For 4th Pakistan Media Awards the ceremony will be honoured the cinematic year of 2012 and 2013 both.

Awards also hold a 45-minute pre-show or notoriously called red carpet, special host(s) interviewed VIPs or Celebrities who are nominated for that ceremony, this is also televised show, and telecast half an hour earlier from the show or one day prior to the show.

Award ceremonies
Pakistan Media Awards has pulled in a bigger haul when box-office hits are favoured to win the Best Picture trophy, Best Television Serial trophy and in others respected categories, ceremony gained a huge attention in 2nd Award Ceremony when Triple-E provide an exceptionally wide range of categories to be awarded.

Notes:
 Due to city fragile and unarmed circumstances, Triple-E on security grounds rescheduled and extend the 3rd award ceremony date.
 Due to Overwhelming response from the public on online votings for the public poll of selected online nominations, Triple-E shift the date of Ceremony in year 2014, as per the high demand of public to extend the voting days for nominations, but, awards will be awarded for cinematic or media year of 2012.

Venue

For the first and second ceremony PMA were presented at Karachi Carlton Hotel in 2010 and 2011 respectively. For the third ceremony awards were held at Expo Centre Karachi, where most of the country events held, expo center is the also scheduled venue for the upcoming 4th Pakistan Media Awards.

Pakistan Media Award for Best Film

Pakistan Media Award for Best Film Director

Pakistan Media Award for Best Film Actor

Pakistan Media Award for Best Film Actress

Pakistan Media Award for Best TV Serial

Pakistan Media Award for Best TV Director

Pakistan Media Award for Best TV Actor

Pakistan Media Award for Best TV Actress

Pakistan Media Award for Best TV Supporting Actor

Pakistan Media Award for Best TV Supporting Actress

Pakistan Media Award for Best TV Writer

Pakistan Media Award for Best TV Original Soundtrack

Pakistan Media Award for Best Telefilm

Pakistan Media Award for Best TV Soap

Pakistan Media Award for Best Sitcom

Pakistan Media Award for Best Morning Show

Pakistan Media Award for Best Morning Show Anchor

Pakistan Media Award for Best Male Singer

Pakistan Media Award for Best Female Singer

Pakistan Media Award for Best Theatre

Pakistan Media Award for Best Male Model

Pakistan Media Award for Best Female Model

Pakistan Media Award for Best Fashion Designer

Pakistan Media Award for Best Makeup Artist

PMA News Categories

PMA Radio Categories

Special categories

The Special Pakistan Media Awards are voted on by special committees, rather than by the Triple-E membership as a whole. They are not always presented on a consistent annual basis. Following is the listing of Pakistan Media Awards Special categories since 2010.

Life Time Achievement Award

 Special Recognition Award

Associated events
 Nomination luncheon
 Invitation Event
 Making of Awards
 Awards Pre-Show
 Winners Bash party

This article is a stub, help by expanding it if you have valid sources of 3rd Pakistan Media Awards winners

See also
 List of Asian television awards
 17th PTV Awards
 11th Lux Style Awards
 2012 Nigar Awards
 1st Hum Awards

References

Ary News Live

External links

Official Website
 

 
Annual events in Pakistan
Awards established in 2010
2010 establishments in Pakistan
Pakistani film awards
Pakistani television awards
Pakistani music awards
Pakistani fashion awards
Pakistani journalism awards
Radio awards